Hitchin Town Hall is a municipal structure in Brand Street, Hitchin, Hertfordshire, England. The town hall, which was the headquarters of Hitchin Urban District Council, is a Grade II listed building.

History

The first town hall in Hitchin was a building designed by Thomas Bellamy in the Italianate style, which was erected on the south side of Pound Street, now known as Brand Street, in 1840.  After population growth in the late 19th century, partly associated with the straw plaiting and lavender growing industries, the area became an urban district in 1894. In this context, the new civic leaders decided that the existing town hall was inadequate and that they would procure a new structure: the site chosen, on the opposite side of Brand Street, was occupied by William Jelly's tin plate workshop. The cost of the land acquisition was paid for by five wealthy dignitaries from the local area.

The new building was designed by Edward Mountford and Thomas Lucas in the Neo-Georgian style, built in red brick with stone dressings by Fosters at a cost of £7,300 and officially opened by Mrs Hudson, the wife of the local member of parliament, George Hudson, on 18 March 1901. The design involved a symmetrical main frontage with seven bays facing onto the Brand Street; the central bay, which slightly projected forward, featured an arched doorway with a large keystone on the ground floor and mullioned windows on the first floor flanked by full-height pilasters supporting a modillioned pediment with the town's coat of arms in the tympanum. The pilasters were carved at the top with the letters "HUDC" (for Hitchin Urban District Council) and "AD MCM" (AD 1900). A cupola was erected at roof level. Internally, the principal rooms are the main assembly hall, now known as the Mountford Hall, and a reception room known as the Lucas Room.

The suffragette, Emmeline Pankhurst, visited the town hall and made a speech supporting women's suffrage in March 1907, while performers hosting concerts included the Jamaican reggae band Bob Marley and the Wailers in May 1973. The building continued to serve as the headquarters of Hitchin Urban District Council for much of the 20th century but ceased to be the local seat of government when the enlarged North Hertfordshire District Council was formed in Letchworth in 1974.

The town hall was closed in October 2012 to allow a major programme of works to be undertaken at a cost of £6 million: the works involved an extension to the southeast, with a glass and steel frontage, to create the North Hertfordshire Museum. The museum, which brought together collections from both the former Hitchin Museum and Art Gallery and the former Letchworth Museum & Art Gallery, opened in July 2019.

Notes

References

Government buildings completed in 1901
City and town halls in Hertfordshire
Buildings and structures in Hitchin
Grade II listed buildings in Hertfordshire